HBES may refer to:

Home and Building Electronic Systems
Human Behavior and Evolution Society
Hierarchical Hash-Chain Broadcast Encryption Scheme